Edward John Barrington Montagu-Scott, 3rd Baron Montagu of Beaulieu (20 October 1926 – 31 August 2015) was a British aristocrat and Conservative politician, best known for founding the National Motor Museum, as well as for a pivotal cause célèbre following his 1954 conviction and imprisonment for alleged homosexual activity, a charge he denied.

Early life

Montagu was born at his grandparents' house in Thurloe Square, South Kensington, London, and inherited his barony in 1929 at the age of two, when his father John died of pneumonia. He held his peerage for the third longest time (86 years and 155 days) anyone has held a British peerage (the others being the 7th Marquess Townshend at 88 years, and the 13th Lord Sinclair at 87 years). His mother was his father's second wife, Alice Crake (1895–1996). He attended St Peter's Court, a prep school at Broadstairs in Kent, then Ridley College in Canada, Eton College and finally New College, Oxford.

He served as a lieutenant in the Grenadier Guards, including service in Palestine before the end of the British Mandate. On coming of age, Lord Montagu immediately took his seat in the House of Lords and swiftly made his maiden speech on the subject of Palestine. He read Modern History at Oxford, but during his second year an altercation between the Bullingdon Club, of which he was a member, and the Oxford University Dramatic Society led to his room being wrecked, and he felt obliged to leave.

Activities

Lord Montagu gained an interest in motoring from his father – who had commissioned the original "Spirit of Ecstasy" mascot for his Rolls-Royce – and with his family collection of historic cars this led him to open the National Motor Museum in the grounds of his stately home, Beaulieu Palace House, Beaulieu, Hampshire, in 1952.

From 1956 to 1961 he held the influential Beaulieu Jazz Festival in the grounds of Palace House; this was a leading contribution to the development of festival culture in Britain, as it attracted thousands of young people who, from 1958 on, would camp out and listen and dance to live music. The 1960 festival saw an altercation between modern and trad jazz fans that became known as the Battle of Beaulieu.

Montagu founded The Veteran And Vintage Magazine in 1956 and continued to develop the museum, making a name for himself in tourism. He was chairman of the Historic Houses Association from 1973 to 1978, President of the Institute of Traffic Administration from 1973 to 1974 and chairman of English Heritage from 1984 to 1992. Whilst there he appointed Jennifer Page (later of the Millennium Dome) as Chief Executive in 1989.

In the 1999 reform of the House of Lords, Montagu was one of 92 hereditary peers who remained in Parliament. In 2007, he was Vice-Commodore of the House of Lords Yacht Club.

He gave a notice of his intention to retire from the House of Lords on 17 September 2015, but he died before that.

Sexuality

Montagu knew from an early stage of life that he was bisexual, and while attending Oxford was relieved to find others with similar feelings.  In a 2000 interview he stated, "My attraction to both sexes neither changed nor diminished at university and it was comforting to find that I was not the only person faced with such a predicament.  I agonised less than my contemporaries, for I was reconciled to my bisexuality, but I was still nervous about being exposed."

Trial and imprisonment
Despite keeping his homosexual affairs discreet and out of the public eye, in the mid-1950s, Montagu became "one of the most notorious public figures of his generation," after his conviction and imprisonment for "conspiracy to incite certain male persons to commit serious offences with male persons," a charge which was also used in the Oscar Wilde trials in 1895, which was derived from a law that remained on the statute books until 1967.

In old age, Montagu reminisced about it in these terms:

In the cold war atmosphere of the 1950s, when witch hunts later called the Lavender Scare were ruining the lives of many gay men and lesbian women in the United States, the parallel political atmosphere in Britain was virulently anti-homosexual. The then Home Secretary, Sir David Maxwell Fyfe, had promised "a new drive against male vice" that would "rid England of this plague." As many as 1,000 men were locked up in Britain's prisons every year amid a widespread police clampdown on homosexual offences. Undercover officers acting as "agents provocateurs" would pose as gay men soliciting in public places. The prevailing mood was one of barely concealed paranoia.

On two occasions Montagu was charged and committed for trial at Winchester Assizes, firstly in 1953 for having underage sex with a 14-year-old boy scout at his beach hut on the Solent, a charge he always denied. The American Institute of Public Relations had just voted him the most promising young PR man when he was arrested. Although he enjoyed the support of his close family and a wide variety of friends, for a year or so he became "the subject of endless blue jokes and innumerable bawdy songs".

When prosecutors failed to achieve a conviction, in what Montagu has characterised as a "witch hunt" to secure a high-profile conviction, he was arrested again in 1954 and charged with performing "gross offences" with an RAF serviceman during a weekend party at the beach hut on his country estate. Montagu always maintained he was innocent of this charge as well ("We had some drinks, we danced, we kissed, that's all"). Nevertheless, he was imprisoned for twelve months for "consensual homosexual offences" along with Michael Pitt-Rivers and Peter Wildeblood.

Role in LGBT history
Unlike the other defendants in the trial, Montagu continued to protest his innocence. The trial caused a backlash of opinion among some politicians and church leaders that led to the setting up of the Wolfenden Committee, which in its 1957 report recommended the decriminalisation of homosexual activity in private between two adults.  Ten years later, Parliament finally carried out the recommendation, a huge turning point in gay history in Britain, where anal sex, a form of "buggery", had been a criminal offence ever since the Buggery Act 1533.

In 2000, when his autobiography appeared, Montagu broke down in tears when it was suggested to him that the reform of the law on homosexuality would be his monument. In a 2007 interview, when asked if he felt that he and his co-defendants had been instrumental in the decriminalisation of homosexuality in Britain, Lord Montagu said, "I am slightly proud that the law has been changed to the benefit of so many people. I would like to think that I would get some credit for that. Maybe I'm being very boastful about it but I think because of the way we behaved and conducted our lives afterwards, because we didn't sell our stories, we just returned quietly to our lives, I think that had a big effect on public opinion."

Personal life and death
In 1958, Lord Montagu of Beaulieu married Belinda Crossley, a granddaughter of the 1st Baron Somerleyton, by whom he had a son and a daughter before the couple divorced in 1974:
 Ralph Montagu-Scott, 4th Baron Montagu of Beaulieu (born 13 March 1961)
 Hon. Mary Montagu-Scott (born 1964), married with issue to Rupert Scott (who took the surname Montagu-Scott, 4th son of Christopher Bartle Hugh Scott, 12th of Gala)

In 1974, he married his second wife, Fiona Margaret Herbert, with whom he had a son:
 Hon. Jonathan Deane Montagu-Scott (born 11 October 1975).

Fiona, Lady Montagu of Beaulieu, was born in about 1943 in Southern Rhodesia (now Zimbabwe), the daughter of Richard Leonard Deane Herbert, of Clymping, Sussex. She attended school in Switzerland, and following her education, she worked as film production assistant. She is a director of Beaulieu Enterprises and a trustee of the Countryside Education Trust. She serves as an international advisor to the World Centre of Compassion for Children, led by Nobel Peace Laureate, Betty Williams, as well as a Trustee of Vision-in-Action, led by Yasuhiko Kimura. She additionally serves on The World Wisdom Council, alongside Mikhail Gorbachev, former head of state of the Soviet Union. She was appointed the first global ambassador to the Club of Budapest.

Montagu died after a short illness, on 31 August 2015 at the age of 88, at his Beaulieu Estate in the New Forest. He was survived by his three children and two grandchildren.

Memoirs and documentary film
For nearly half a century, Montagu steadfastly refused to speak publicly about the conviction, instead focusing his energies on the National Motor Museum and other activities. However, in 2000, he finally broke his silence with the publication of his memoirs, Wheels Within Wheels, of which two chapters are devoted to the story of his trial and imprisonment. In interviews, he has stated that by publishing his story, he wanted to "put the record straight", because he "felt it was important to get it accurate."

The story of Montagu's trial is told in a 2007 Channel 4 documentary, A Very British Sex Scandal, and the 2017 BBC drama-documentary Against The Law.

In April 2013, the Newport Beach Film Festival, at Newport Beach, California, screened Lord Montagu, a documentary by Luke Korem on Montagu's life and accomplishments. The film was also shown at the Napa Valley Film Festival in November 2013.

References
Notes

Bibliography
 The Gilt and the Gingerbread, or How to Live in a Stately Home and Make Money (1967) by Lord Montagu of Beaulieu, Michael Joseph Ltd
 Antique Cars (1974) by Lord Montagu of Beaulieu, Golden Press, 
 Wheels Within Wheels (2001) by Lord Montagu Weidenfeld & Nicolson, 
 The Beaulieu Encyclopedia of the Automobile (2000, 3 Volumes) by Nick Georgano, foreword by Lord Montagu of Beaulieu, Routledge, 

Further reading
 Heald, Tim (1992). Honourable Estates: the English and Their Country Houses, Pavilion Books, page 53. 
 Brandreth, Gyles (2003). Brief encounters: meetings with remarkable people, Politico's Publishing Ltd, pp. 137–144, 
 McKay, George (2005) Circular Breathing: The Cultural Politics of Jazz in Britain, Duke University Press. Chapter 1 includes material on Beaulieu Jazz Festival.

External links

 
 
 Beaulieu website

1926 births
2015 deaths
Alumni of New College, Oxford
Edward
Bisexual men
Bisexual politicians
British car collectors
Conservative Party (UK) hereditary peers
English prisoners and detainees
Grenadier Guards officers
LGBT peers
English LGBT politicians
People educated at Eton College
People educated at St Peter's Court
People convicted of sodomy
Ridley College alumni
Edward
People convicted for homosexuality in the United Kingdom
LGBT military personnel
Hereditary peers elected under the House of Lords Act 1999